South Ferry may refer to:

South Ferry (Manhattan), the location at the southern tip of Manhattan where the Staten Island Ferry Whitehall Terminal is located
South Ferry, Brooklyn, the former ferry landing at the foot of Atlantic Avenue in Brooklyn
The former ferry between Manhattan and Brooklyn which gave its name to the sites in Manhattan and Brooklyn
South Ferry/Whitehall Street (New York City Subway), the subway complex at South Ferry, Manhattan
South Ferry (IRT Broadway–Seventh Avenue Line), 2009–2012, closed for reconstruction after Hurricane Sandy, reopened 2017 to serve the 
Whitehall Street–South Ferry (BMT Broadway Line), serving the 
South Ferry loops (New York City Subway), the former loop subway station at South Ferry, Manhattan 
South Ferry (IRT elevated station), the former elevated station at South Ferry, Manhattan
South Ferry (Shelter Island), the ferry from North Haven to Shelter Island